Vyborg Shipyard PJSC is a shipbuilding company located in Vyborg, Russia. The company has a focus on icebreakers and other icegoing vessels for arctic conditions, but the company has also built deep sea semi-submersible floating drilling and production platforms for exploration of oil and gas offshore fields. Vyborg Shipyard employs more than 1,500 people.

History 
The shipyard was founded in 1948 and since then has built more than 200 different vessels with deadweight up to 12,000 tons. The total displacement of the built vessels is over 1,550,000 tons.  At present the shipyard is able to build different type of vessels with deadweight up to 15,000 tons. When the shipyard builds bigger ships the hulls of the ships will be assembled at the semi-submersible barge Atlant built at the Vyborg shipyard specially for implementation of the Project 21900M icebreaker order. To launch the icebreaker the barge was towed to the deepwater area of the Vyborg Bay.

In January 1996, Kvaerner, also spelled Kværner, purchased a stake in the Vyborg Shipyard and renamed it Kverner-Vyborg Shipyard which employed 300 people and was the largest manufacturer of offshore installations in Russia.  On 10 March 2000, Kvaerner sold the Vyborg Shipyard, which had 1500 employees but was losing money and faced closure during 1999, to the Sergey Zavyalov associated early 1990s established Ako Barss Group which then sold the shipyard to Rossiya Bank owners who placed the shipyard in the United Shipbuilding Corporation (USC). As of 2015, Alexander Solovyov, an ex director of Ako Barss Group, heads the Vyborg Shipyard.

In 2012, Vyborg Shipyard joined the United Shipbuilding Corporation.

Current Projects and Orders 
On July 10, 2014 Vyborg Shipyard signed a subcontract with Arctech Helsinki Shipyard. According to the contract Vyborg Shipyard will fabricate sections and blocks for a platform supply vessel for Sovcomflot JSC built by Arctech Helsinki Shipyard. Design and equipment of the new vessel enable all-year-round transportation of personnel and supplies to the oil production platforms at Sakhalin-2 region and enhance their oil spill response and emergency evacuation capacity. The vessel is a further developed version in a series of two icebreaking supply vessels Aleksey Chirikov and Vitus Bering also built in co-operation between Arctech Helsinki Shipyard and Vyborg Shipyard. In summer 2014, Arctech and Vyborg Shipyard received an additional order of three icebreaking stand-by vessels of this class.

On April 30, 2015 Vyborg Shipyard signed contract for construction of a port icebreaker under Yamal LNG project for the port of Sabetta. The distinctive feature of the vessel is the propulsion system consisting of four azimuthing propulsion units with capacity of 3 MW each. The thrusters are located in pairs in bow and in stern that provides maximized operability in ice conditions, excellent maneuverability and performance of special operations in the water area of the Sabetta port where at the present moment LNG plant is under construction for Yamal LNG project. The icebreaker, named Ob, was laid down on 27 September 2016.

In April 2015, Vyborg Shipyard signed contract which stipulated that two multi-purpose diesel-powered icebreaking support vessels 21.5 MW will be built at Vyborg Shipyard by the order of Gazprom Neft Novy Port. According to the contract both vessels will be delivered to the customer by 2018. Icebreaking support vessels will be operated on the Arctic terminal of the Novoportovskoye oilfield located in the west of the Gulf of Ob on the Yamal Peninsula. Design of the new vessels is based on the Aker ARC 130 A concept by Aker Arctic. The first of two vessels ordered was laid down on November 3, 2015.

In September 2015 Rosmorport had submitted a proposal on extension of the series of Project 21900M icebreakers. The current order comprise three ships. Vyborg Shipyard has already completed one ship, Vladivostok, and has launched another ship, Novorossiysk. The third ship, Murmansk, was built by Arctech Helsinki Shipyard in Finland.

, Vyborg Shipyard is also building a series of four vessels project KMT01 to Russian fishing companies, the contract worth was more than 11 billion roubles.

On February 4, 2021, the large-capacity processor-trawler project KMT01 vessel called Barentsevo More had its official flag-raising ceremony and left for fishing trials in the Barents Sea.

Ships built or on order

Notes

References 

Shipbuilding companies of the Soviet Union
United Shipbuilding Corporation
Companies based in Leningrad Oblast
Companies listed on the Moscow Exchange
Russian brands